Palash Baran Pal (Bengali: পলাশ বরন পাল Palāś Baran Pāl, born : 1955) is an Indian theoretical physicist, an Emeritus Professor in the Physics Department of Science College, Calcutta University, Kolkata, a writer, a linguist and a poet. His main area of research is Particle Physics. His works in the area of neutrino physics and relativistic treatment of particle properties in matter are well recognized in the particle physics community. Apart from his scientific contributions, he has authored well known text books in physics as well as several popular science literature in Bengali to popularize science.

Early life 

Born to Amulya Bhushan Pal and Niva Pal on 4 September 1955, Palash Pal is the eldest of three siblings. He did his schooling from BE College Model School at Howrah. He received his bachelor's degree in Physics from Presidency College, Kolkata (affiliated to Calcutta University, Calcutta, India) in 1975 and master's degree in Physics from the renowned Science College campus of Calcutta University, Calcutta, India in 1979. He then moved to United States for further studies. He received his Doctorate Degree from Carnegie-Mellon University, Pittsburgh, United States in the year 1983. After that, he was associated with University of Maryland, University of Massachusetts, University of Oregon and University of Texas respectively as post-doctoral fellow before he came back to India in 1994.

Career 

After he returned to India, Pal took up professorship at Indian Institute of Astrophysics, Bangalore, India in 1994 where he stayed till 1997 before he moved to Kolkata. He then joined the Theory Division of Saha Institute of Nuclear Physics, Kolkata where he remained in service till September 2017. He is now an Emeritus Professor in the Physics Department of Calcutta University, Kolkata.

Palash Pal has worked in various branches of modern physics.
Primarily a particle physicist, his works encompass studies in the 
standard model of particle physics. Some of his pioneering works are particularly
focused on the topic of massive neutrinos, whose theoretical basis
requires physics beyond the standard model. His original contributions to the field of neutrino physics include calculation of Feynman diagrams for Majorana fermions., determination of properties of fermions in matters and magnetic fields, and a quantum field
theoretic reworking of Lincoln Wolfenstein's formula predicting the properties of
neutrino oscillation in presence of matter.
His review on the neutrino physics gives a lucid description of the 
solar neutrino problem which appeals to a wider class of physicists.

Apart from his contributions to neutrino physics, Pal has done important work related to grand unification theory
and statistical field theory (popularly called thermal field theory). Some of his works deal with the 
quantum field theoretic calculations of self-energies of photon and neutrino in a
background of charged particles (as electrons, positrons or charged weak gauge bosons) in thermal equilibrium. Pal has also ventured
into calculations where the background for various elementary particle
processes includes a thermal bath of charged particles in presence of
constant magnetic field.

Palash Pal is also well known for his teaching and has taught various topics of modern physics in the teaching program of Saha Institute of Nuclear Physics. Most of the material he has taught have been later turned into books which includes subjects like particle physics, statistical physics and quantum field theory. Except these books Palash B. Pal and Rabindra N. Mohapatra have written the book titled "Massive neutrinos in physics and astrophysics", which is a standard text for both newcomers and old practitioners working in the field of neutrino physics or astroparticle physics.

Pal started contributing to Bengali literature through popular science articles from as early as 1988. Eight such books and many other articles published in several magazines show his enthusiasm to reach out to an individual who has any scientific curiosity. His other writings in Bengali, which include several articles on Bengali phonetics, orthography and grammar, Bengali translations of poetries written in other foreign languages, such as the ones by Nobel Laureate Pablo Neruda, and folktales for children carry the signature of his varied interests in literature and linguistics. He has received two awards in the field of literature, Rabindra Smriti Puroshkar in 2004 and Ramendra Sundar Smriti Puroshkar in 2011, for his popular-level books Bigyān: byakti jukti somoy somāj (বিজ্ঞান: ব্যক্তি যুক্তি সময় সমাজ) and Einstein-er uttorādhikār (আইনস্টাইনের উত্তরাধিকার), respectively.

Books 

Besides many scientific papers, Palash Pal has written Physics textbooks in English, and popular-level scientific books and pedagogical scientific articles in Bengali. He has translated several poetries written in foreign languages, such as Spanish, French and Japanese, into Bengali. Among these, the Spanish and the French poetries are direct translations made from the original texts, whereas the collection of translation of Japanese Haikus was made from the English translations of these poetries. Pal's translation of the Spanish poetries written by Pablo Neruda is one of the first translations of an entire Spanish book into Bengali. Apart from that, Palash Pal has also translated several Bengali popular literature by other Bengali literary laureates into English. He has authored books on linguistics and folktales in Bengali. An exhaustive list of the books, authored by him so far, is as follows:

 Academic Books 

Popular-level Books 

  Translations 

 Books on linguistics 

Folktales

Software 
Palash Pal has developed two latex based packages :
bangtex : for typesetting documents in Bangla using the Tex/Latex systems 
pptalk : a Latex-based package for talk presentation

Personal life 

Palash Pal is married to Shukla Sanyal (শুক্লা সান্যাল), who was a professor of history at Calcutta University and Presidency University Kolkata, respectively, and has one daughter, Shoili Pal (ৈশলী পাল), and one son, Proyag Pal (প্রয়াগ পাল).

References

External links 

 
 Translated stories by Palash Baran Pal
 A review of his book An introductory course of Statistical Mechanics published in Resonance
 A review of his book Hok kothā, হক কথা published in Desh

 Full list of scientific publications by Palash B. Pal

1955 births
Living people
Indian Institute of Astrophysics
Indian theoretical physicists
Presidency University, Kolkata alumni
University of Calcutta alumni
Carnegie Mellon University alumni
Scholars from West Bengal